The 1932–33 Western Kentucky State Teachers Hilltoppers men's basketball team represented Western Kentucky State Normal School and Teachers College 
(now known as Western Kentucky University)  during the 1932-33 NCAA basketball season. The team was led by future Naismith Memorial Basketball Hall of Fame coach Edgar Diddle and team captain Wendell Johnson.  The Hilltoppers won the Kentucky Intercollegiate Athletic Conference for the second consecutive year.  Harry Hardin, Thomas Hobbs, and future Louisville Cardinals men's basketball coach, Bernard “Peck” Hickman were named to the All-State team.

Schedule

|-
!colspan=6| 1933 Kentucky Intercollegiate Athletic Conference Tournament

|-
!colspan=6| 1933 Southern Intercollegiate Athletic Association Tournament

References

Western Kentucky Hilltoppers basketball seasons
Western Kentucky State Teachers
Western Kentucky State Teachers
Western Kentucky State Teachers